Fahmida Mirza (born 20 December 1956) is a Pakistani politician who was Federal Minister for Inter Provincial Coordination, in office from 20 August 2018 until 10 April 2022. She served as the 18th and only women Speaker of the National Assembly of Pakistan from March 2008 to June 2013.

Previously, she was a member of the National Assembly from 1997 to 1999 , 2002 to May 2018 and again she has been a member of the National Assembly of Pakistan since August 2018.

Early life and education
Mirza was born on  20 December 1956 in Karachi to Qazi Abdul Majeed Abid. She belongs to an influential political family of Sindh. Mirza is married to Zulfiqar Mirza. She has two sons and two daughters.

Mirza did her schooling from St Mary's Convent in Hyderabad in 1972. She is a medical graduate and did her MBBS from Liaquat Medical College in Jamshoro in 1982. She is an agriculturist and businesswoman by profession. She was chief executive of a Karachi-based advertising company and the chief executive officer of the Mirza Sugar Mills.

Political career
Mirza joined Pakistan Peoples Party (PPP) in 1997 and was elected to the National Assembly of Pakistan as a candidate of PPP from Constituency NA-173 (Badin-II) in 1997 Pakistani general election.

She was re-elected to the National Assembly as a candidate of PPP from Constituency NA-225 (Badin-II) in 2002 Pakistani general election. She received 71,537 votes and defeated Khan Mohammad Halipota, a candidate of Pakistan Muslim League (Q) (PML-Q).

She was re-elected to the National Assembly as a candidate of PPP from Constituency NA-225 (Badin-cum-Tando Muhammad Khan-II) in 2008 Pakistani general election. She received 88,983 votes and defeated Bibi Yasmeen Shah, a candidate of PML-Q.

In March 2008, she was elected as the 18th and first women Speaker of the National Assembly of Pakistan. She received 249 votes and defeated her opponent Muhammad Israr Tareen who secured 70 votes.

She was re-elected to the National Assembly as a candidate of PPP from Constituency (Badin-cum-Tando Muhammad Khan-II) in 2013 Pakistani general election. She received 110,738 votes and defeated Bibi Yasmeen Shah, a candidate of Pakistan Muslim League (F) (PML-F).

In May 2018, she quit PPP, saying that "the PPP government caused deteriorating conditions in Sindh and ignored the people of Badin". She announced to join a party which providing basic facilities to the people of her constituency, Badin. In June 2018, she joined Grand Democratic Alliance (GDA).

In June 2018, both Mirza and her husband Zulfiqar Mirza were declared loan defaulters by the State Bank of Pakistan. It was noted that the couple used political influence to obtain millions of loans from different banks which were later written-off.

She was re-elected to the National Assembly as a candidate of GDA from Constituency NA-230 (Badin-II) in 2018 Pakistani general election.

On 18 August, Imran Khan formally announced his federal cabinet structure and Mirza was named as Minister for Inter Provincial Coordination. On 20 August 2018, she was sworn in as Federal Minister for Inter Provincial Coordination in the federal cabinet of Prime Minister Imran Khan.

References

1956 births
Living people
Women federal ministers of Pakistan
Pakistani business executives
Pakistani MNAs 1997–1999
Pakistani MNAs 2002–2007
Pakistani MNAs 2008–2013
Pakistani MNAs 2013–2018
Pakistani MNAs 2018–2023
Pakistan People's Party MNAs
Women members of the National Assembly of Pakistan
Women legislative speakers
Speakers of the National Assembly of Pakistan
F
Grand Democratic Alliance MNAs
21st-century Pakistani women politicians